Jim Miller (born 1954) is a rock and roll guitarist, singer, teacher, recording artist and band leader in the “jam band” genre’. He has performed with Oroboros and his present group, JiMiller Band. He has also founded and organized several events, including co-founding the Rock & Reggae Festival and founding Lazy Daisy and DeadFall at Nelson Ledges State Park in northeast Ohio. He lives in Cleveland, Ohio.

Personal history
Miller was born July 2, 1954, at the historic St. Ann's Hospital in Cleveland, Ohio. He has a wife, Beth, a son named Michael who plays guitar in the JiMiller Band, and two stepchildren, Reid and Sarah Street.

Oroboros
Miller co-founded Oroboros in 1980 as a Grateful Dead tribute band, which soon generated original music in the jam band genre. It was named for the ouroboros, an ancient symbol for infinity, depicting a serpent or dragon eating its own tail. Among the bands they have opened for are Go Ahead (with members of the Grateful Dead and Santana), The Radiators, Black Uhuru, Santana and Rusted Root. They co-founded the Rock & Reggae Festival in 1984 with First Light at Meadowoods Farm, originally as a benefit for the Cleveland Free Clinic. They performed until 1998, produced five albums, and played a reunion concert in 2003.

Past members
 Jim Miller (guitar & vocals)
 Bill Cogan (guitar & vocals)
 Mary Beth Cooper (vocals, etc.)
 Gary Maxwell (bass)
 Rocky Miller (keyboards)
 Rob Luoma (drums).
 Dave Downing (bass)
 Don Safranek (percussion)
 Will Douglas (drums)
 Scott Swanson (bass)
 Mike Rotman (keyboard, guitar, percussion)
 Mike Verbick (guitar)
 Michael Bradley (keyboards, vocals)
 Ned Kalafat (bass)

Highlights
 1984 - Co-Founded the Rock & Reggae Festival with the band First Light
 1994 - HORDE Tour (Blossom Music Center)
 1991 – opened for Phish at the Agora (Cleveland, Ohio)
 1995, 1996 & 1997 (July) – Starwood Festival (Sherman, New York)
 1996 - Southern Thailand Jazz Festival
 1996 - Furthur Festival
 2003 - Reunion

Discography
 1985 - Different Feeling
 1988 - Psycha Deli: Live at the Euclid Tavern
 1991 - First Circle
 1993 - Serpent's Dance
 1996 - Shine

JiMiller Band
The JiMiller Band was founded in 1998 by Jim Miller, continuing to play the style of jam band music Miller played with Oroboros. They have performed since their founding, sharing the stage with such notable bands and artists as String Cheese Incident, Galactic, Bruce Hornsby, Little Feat, Rusted Root and the Rhythm Devils, and produced four CDs.

Current roster
 Jim Miller - Lead Vocals & Lead Guitar
 Vince Berry - Guitar
 Steve "Nev" Scheff - Keyboard & Vocals
 Brian "Bagel" Golenberg - Drums & Vocals
 Dave Blackerby – Bass

Past members
 Brett Miller (bass)
 Matt Harmon (guitar, dobro)
 Dan Carter (drums)
 Rick Davidson (guitar)
 Steve Zavesky (drums)
 Mike Miller (guitar)

Highlights
 2004 - 10,000 Lakes Festival
 2005 & 2006 (summer) - opened for Little Feat at Cleveland's House of Blues
 2007 (Memorial Day weekend) - opened for Rusted Root at Tower City Center Amphitheater (Cleveland)
 2007 (New Year's Eve) – opened for Rusted Root at The House of Blues (Cleveland)
 2009–2011 – opened for the Early Bird Festival at Nelson Ledges
 2010 (Labor Day) - opened for the Rhythm Devils with Mickey Hart and Bill Kreutzmann from The Dead.
 2012 - Starwood Festival at Wisteria Event Campground (Pomeroy, Ohio)

Discography
 2000 - Rock and Roll Always Do
 2001 - Crooked River Groove
 2004 - Family Roots (Double Live CD)
 2006 - In Trance It (Double CD: 1 Live, 1 Studio)

Original Songs
Sing It To Your Children
 Sing It To Your Children - Oroboros - Different Feeling Released: 1985
 Sing It To Your Children - Oroboros - Serpent's Dance Released: 1993 (Euclid Tavern, Cleveland OH, 2/26/93)
North Coast Waters
 North Coast Waters - Oroboros - Different Feeling Released: 1985
Agathodaimon
 Agathodaimon - Oroboros - Different Feeling Released: 1985 
 Agathodaimon - Oroboros - Serpent's Dance Released: 1993 (Shuba's, Chicago IL, 3/5/93)
Shake It To The Limit
 Shake It To The Limit - Oroboros - Different Feeling Released: 1985
 Shake It To The Limit - Oroboros - Psycha Deli Released: 1988
Syzygy
 Syzygy - Oroboros - Psycha Deli Released: 1988
Paradox
 Paradox - Oroboros - Psycha Deli Released: 1988
Win or Lose
 Win or Lose - Oroboros - Psycha Deli Released: 1988
Weather the Storm
 Weather the Storm - Oroboros - Psycha Deli Released: 1988
Fog Over the Flats
 Fog Over the Flats - Oroboros - Psycha Deli Released: 1988
Laughing at Harpo
 Laughing at Harpo - Oroboros - Psycha Deli Released: 1988
Water Unto The Stone
 Water Unto The Stone - Oroboros - First Circle Released: 1991
Whispers of Love
 Whispers of Love - Oroboros - First Circle Released: 1991
Glad Messenger
 Glad Messenger - Oroboros - First Circle Released: 1991
The Griffon Song
 The Griffon Song - Oroboros - First Circle Released: 1991
King Kong II
 King Kong II - Oroboros - First Circle Released: 1991
See You Smile
 See You Smile - Oroboros - First Circle Released: 1991
Smell the Roses
 Smell the Roses - Oroboros - Serpent's Dance Released: 1993 (Euclid Tavern, Cleveland OH, 2/26/93)
The River Runs
 The River Runs - Oroboros - Serpent's Dance Released: 1993 (Shuba's, Chicago IL, 3/5/93)
Funk in A
 Funk in A - Oroboros - Serpent's Dance Released: 1993 (Euclid Tavern, Cleveland OH, 4/9/93)
Siddhartha's Train
 Siddhartha's Train - Oroboros - Serpent's Dance Released: 1993 (Euclid Tavern, Cleveland OH, 4/9/93)
The Friend Song
 The Friend Song - Oroboros - Serpent's Dance Released: 1993 (Tulagi's, Boulder CO, 3/27/93)
Shakin' the Cage
 Shakin' the Cage - Oroboros - Serpent's Dance Released: 1993 (Euclid Tavern, Cleveland OH, 4/9/93)
Calliope - Oroboros
 Calliope - Oroboros - Shine Released: 1996
Do All You Can
 Do All You Can - Oroboros - Shine Released: 1996
Leaving This Place Too Soon
 Leaving This Place Too Soon - Oroboros - Shine Released: 1996
Far and Few
 Far and Few - Oroboros - Shine Released: 1996
Big Black Snake Blues
 Big Black Snake Blues - Oroboros - Shine Released: 1996
San Juan Man
 San Juan Man - Oroboros - Shine Released: 1996
Cuyahoga Bayou
 Cuyahoga Bayou - Oroboros - Shine Released: 1996
Won't Be Long
 Won't Be Long - Oroboros - Shine Released: 1996
You Shine
 You Shine - Oroboros - Shine Released: 1996

Notes

References
 Earlybird Gathering Simply Groovy by Malcolm X Abram, April 23, 2010, The 330 
 Grateful Dead at the Rock and Roll Hall of Fame: Poet Mark Kuhar and Rocker Jim Miller Pay Homage by Michael Norman, March 22, 2012, The Plain Dealer 
 ‘In trance it,’ latest JiMiller Band CD, debuts in Lakewood by Charles Cassady in West Life News 
 Jam Bands: North America's Hottest Live Groups Plus How to Tape and Trade Their Shows by Dean Budnick - ECW Press, 1998 
 Jammin' Again: The Midwest's First Jam Band Reunites at the Grog Shop by D.X. Ferris, October 6, 2004, The Cleveland Scene 
 JiMiller Band – Soundclick 
 JiMiller Band 'Grateful' to be Playing Outpost by Allan Lamb, Feb. 17th, 2005, KentWired 
 JiMiller Band's Final Live CD Recording at Park Street Tavern on April 28 by Margaret Marten - Short North Gazette, Mar/Apr 2012 Issue
 Oroboros - The Kipple Archives Volume No. 17, Issue No. 2, April 1990 
 Rock ‘n Roll and the Cleveland Connection: Music of the Great Lakes by Deanna R. Adams - Kent State University Press, 2002 
 Rockers Play Tribute to Grateful Dead by Kenny Miles, September 30, 2005, Grateful Dead News 
 A Slippery Band to Define by Neil Malhatra, February 6, 1998, UWO Gazette

External links
 JiMiller Band Website
 Oroboros Discography
 JiMiller Band on Archive.org

American male singer-songwriters
American rock songwriters
American rock singers
Musicians from Cleveland
Musical groups established in 1980
Musical groups disestablished in 1998
Musical groups established in 1998
Psychedelic rock musicians
Jam bands
Musical groups from Cleveland
1954 births
Living people
Singer-songwriters from Ohio